Raigarh was a princely state in India at the time of the British Raj. The state was ruled by a  Gond dynasty of Gond clan.

History
Raigarh estate was founded in 1625 by Madan Singh. He was descended from the Gond kings of Chanda. In 1911 Raigarh estate was recognized as a state.
The state had an area of  3,848 square km and a population of 174,929 according to the 1901 census. The capital of state was city of Raigarh, which had a population of 6,764 inhabitants in 1901. 

The Rajas of Raigarh also owned the Estate of Bargarh and so held the title of Chief of Bargarh. Around 1625, the Raja of Sambalpur, created Daryo Singh as Raja of Raigarh. However, under British, it became a princely state only in 1911, during the reign of Raja Bahadur Bhup Deo Singh.

Among the notable rulers of State were Deonath Singh, who assisted the British in the Mutiny of 1857. Other rulers were Raja Bahadur Bhup Deo Singh, Raja Chakradhar Singh.
Chakradhar Singh is noted for his contributions to Kathak and Hindustani music, especially for founding of Raigarh Gharana. The last ruler was Lalit Kumar Singh, his son succeeded him to the throne of Raigarh and ruled briefly before the Raigarh State was merged into Union of India on December 14, 1947. The princely states of Jashpur, Raigarh, Sakti, Sarangarh and Udaipur were united later to form the Raigarh district in present Chhattisgarh.

Rulers

Rajas 
c. 1800 - c. 1830         Jujhar Singh 
c. 1830  - 1863           Deonath Singh 
1863 - 1890               Ganshyam Singh
1890 - 1911               Bhup Deo Singh                     (b. 1867 - d. 1917)

Raja Bahadurs 
1911 - 22 Mar 1917         Bhup Deo Singh 
22 Mar 1917 - Feb 1924     Natwar Singh                       (b. 1891 - d. 1924) 
23 Aug 1924 - 15 Aug 1947  Lal Chakradhar Singh               (b. 1905 - d. 1947)
15 Aug 1947 - 1 Aug 1948   Lalitkumar Singh                    (b 1924 - d. 2000)

See also
Eastern States Agency

References

Princely states of India
History of Chhattisgarh
Raigarh district
1947 disestablishments in India
States and territories disestablished in 1947
States and territories established in 1911
1911 establishments in India